Queens Sports Club Ground is a stadium in Bulawayo, Zimbabwe. It is used primarily used for cricket matches. The stadium has a capacity of up to 13,000. The stadium is the home ground for the Matabeleland Tuskers, who are the current Logan Cup champions. The other cricket ground in Bulawayo is the Bulawayo Athletic Club.

Queen's Sports Club is Zimbabwe's second ground, the first being the Harare Sports Club. It is situated close to the city center is one of international cricket's most picturesque venues, with an old pavilion surrounded by trees which give shade to spectators. Much of the ground consists of grass banking and its capacity of 13,000 is more than enough to cope with demand. Queens Sports Club became Zimbabwe's third Test venue in October 1994. The Zimbabwe national cricket team has had much success at this venue, beating teams like England, West Indies, Australia, Pakistan and the once weak Bangladesh. In recent times however it has been a stadium of horror for the locals, as it was at this venue where Zimbabwe lost to lower ranked Afghanistan.

During a Currie Cup match between Eastern Province and Rhodesia in 1954/55, the scorers' box became a mass of smoke and sparks after electrical equipment was struck by lightning.

See also
List of international cricket five-wicket hauls at the Queens Sports Club
List of Test cricket grounds

Notes

References

External links
Cricinfo

Cricket grounds in Zimbabwe
2003 Cricket World Cup stadiums
Buildings and structures in Bulawayo
Multi-purpose stadiums in Zimbabwe
Test cricket grounds in Zimbabwe
Sports venues completed in 1893
1890s establishments in Africa